Antigua and Barbuda competed at the 2015 Pan American Games in Toronto, Ontario, Canada from July 10 to 26, 2015. The Chef de mission of the team was Howard Everton Cornelius.

The Antigua and Barbuda team consisted of ten athletes across three sports. This marked an increase of three from the last edition of the games in 2011. Track and field athlete Daniel Bailey was the flagbearer for the team during the opening ceremony.

Priscilla Frederick, a high jumper won the country's only medal (silver), ranking the country 25th overall in the medal table.

Competitors
The following table lists Antigua and Barbuda's delegation per sport and gender.

Medalists

The following competitors from Antigua and Barbuda won medals at the games. In the by discipline sections below, medalists' names are bolded.

|  style="text-align:left; width:78%; vertical-align:top;"|

|  style="text-align:left; width:22%; vertical-align:top;"|

Athletics

Antigua and Barbuda's team consisted of five athletes (four men and one woman). The team was cut in half after the Pan American Sports Organization had to pare down the number of athletes after double the original quota qualified.

Men

Jarvis was named to the team but did not compete in either the heats or final.

Women

Cycling

Antigua and Barbuda has qualified one male cyclist, and later received a wildcard quota in the women's events.

Road

Swimming

Antigua and Barbuda received two universality spots (one male and one female).

References

Nations at the 2015 Pan American Games
P
2015